The Observer is a newspaper for the residents of Northern Chautauqua County, NY and northwestern Cattaraugus County, NY, with offices located in Dunkirk, NY. Formerly known as the Evening Observer, and before then, the Dunkirk Evening Observer, it was originally delivered in the afternoon six days a week (Monday through Saturday), although it has since switched to morning delivery seven days a week.

The Observer was first published December 4, 1882 by founder Dr. Julien T. Williams. John D'Agostino, former news and managing editor, is the current Publisher.

The newspaper describes itself as a hometown paper, but it is owned by Ogden Newspapers Inc. of Wheeling, West Virginia; the paper is operated in a cluster along with The Post-Journal of Jamestown, New York and the Times-Observer of Warren, Pennsylvania.

From March 13, 2014 to October 31, 2016, the entirety of the newspaper's Web site was placed behind a paywall. The site had been behind a paywall for most of the early 2000s but that paywall was also eventually removed.

References

External links 
Observer website
Ogden Newspapers, Inc. website

Daily newspapers published in New York (state)
Publications established in 1882